Elina Ribakova is an economist and expert on Emerging Markets in Eastern Europe, the Middle East and Africa (EMEA). Her field of expertise includes the Russian economy, US-Russia relations, macro-financial stability and macroeconomic research for investment decisions.

She holds an MSc in Economics from the University of Warwick where she was the sole recipient in her year of the Shiv Nath Prize and a BSc in Economics and Business from the Stockholm School of Economics in Riga.

She was a visiting fellow at Bruegel and at the Institute of Global Affairs (IGA) at the London School of Economics and Political Science, contributing to the Rethinking Global Finance and Global Migration initiatives.

Elina was a Foreign Policy Interrupted Fellow, holder of a Chevening Scholarship and Open Society Foundations alumnus.

Previously, Elina worked at the International Monetary Fund, focusing on issues of financial stability, crisis resolution, fiscal policy in commodity-producing countries and determinants of foreign direct investment (FDI). She also worked as Chief Economist for Russia/CIS at Citigroup.

She is also a co-founder of Migration Matters - video-based multidisciplinary resource on migration. She lectured on international macro with finance applications at Chicago Booth, Higher School of Economics, New Economic School, European University at Saint Petersburg and Stockholm School of Economics in Riga.

She is currently Deputy Chief Economist at the IIF. Previously she held senior positions at international banks, an institutional asset manager and a macro hedge fund.

Elina is a regular contributor to the media, providing expert topical analysis of economic developments in the EMEA region to a range of leading broadcast and print media outlets including Bloomberg, Bloomberg TV, Reuters and Reuters TV, Vedomosti, the Financial Times and the Wall Street Journal.

Deutsche Bank people
Alumni of the University of Warwick
Stockholm School of Economics alumni
Living people
Year of birth missing (living people)